Terence Ashley Burrows is an English author, multi-instrumental musician and producer based in London. Best known as a cult performer under the alias Yukio Yung, Burrows is also a prolific author of books relating to music history, theory, and tuition, technology, business, popular psychology and modern history. His works include The Art of Sound (Thames & Hudson), Mute: A Visual Document (co-authored with Daniel Miller) (Thames & Hudson), Guitars Illustrated (Billboard), 1001 Guitars... (Cassell), KISS Guide to Playing Guitar (Dorling Kindersley), Total Guitar Tutor (Barnes & Noble), and ITV Visual History of the 20th Century (Carlton). His books—now numbering close to one hundred titles—have been published in sixteen different countries and translated into a dozen different languages. As a writer, his pseudonyms include Terence Ashley, Harrison Franklin, Hans-Joachim Vollmer and Yukio Yung. He has also written for numerous periodicals in the UK, US, and Germany.

Burrows was born in Ipswich, Suffolk, England and started studying classical piano at the age of five. (AllMusic describes him as "A classically trained keyboardist with an advanced degree in computer engineering.") When he was 12 he started to teach himself guitar, and later took up bass, drums, and saxophone. The anti-establishment attitudes of punk subculture appealed to him but his musical influences included Syd Barrett, Kraftwerk, the Who, Brian Eno, the Television Personalities, and the Canterbury progressive music scene. Still in his teens, Burrows founded indie label, Hamster Records, releasing albums by non-commercial acts such as Loch Ness Monster, Rimarimba, R. Stevie Moore and Attrition, and his own "post-punk industrial funk" under the guise of Jung Analysts. In 1986, Cordelia Records released Burrows' Tree Climbing Goats (And Other Analysing Shanties) LP, his first release under the pseudonym Yukio Yung, chosen because of an obsession at that time with Japanese culture.

In 1986, Burrows met Alan Jenkins, leader of The Deep Freeze Mice, and together they formed The Chrysanthemums, with Burrows as lead singer and keyboard player. A psychedelic art pop band with a large cult following almost entirely outside of the UK, they released four albums and four EPs. In 2010, German music magazine MusikExpress placed them at number 23 in their list of the most under-rated bands of all time.

At this time, Burrows also recorded a series of "abstract industrial" albums with celebrated "Krautrock" musician Asmus Tietchens, a former collaborator with Brian Eno and Cluster. The first volume, Watching The Burning Bride formed the soundtrack to the similarly named film, by Canadian director, Mark Mushet. He also produced a number of albums of instrumental prog-rock-tinged electronica as part of the duo Push-Button Pleasure.

In the early 1990s, Burrows flirted briefly with electronic dance music releasing a pair of 12-inch singles as YooKO on the Belgian ZZB label, one of which, "Matrix", reached the Top Ten in Germany's Network Dance Chart. Burrows later released further solo Yukio Yung material, commencing with 1993's LP Art Pop Stupidity and CD A Brainless Deconstruction of the Popular Song. Over the next four years he released a single and four EPs. In 1997, Burrows rejoined with his ex-Chrysanthemums bandmate Vladimir Zajkowiecz [Martin Howells] to form a new version of that group, renamed with the visual pun Chrys&themums to distinguish it from the original line-up.

Musically, Burrows was uncharacteristically quiet between 1998 and 2004 – a combination of ill health and an increasingly demanding publishing schedule. By 2003, he'd had more than 50 books published, and was recognized as one of the world's biggest-selling authors of music tuition titles, with sales of well over 2 million books in the US alone. During this period he also embarked on an additional career as an occasional university lecturer.

In 2004, Burrows emerged again with a typically colorful selection of music projects, the most significant of which was the resumption of his collaboration with US home-recording pioneer R. Stevie Moore. The resulting album, compiled by Burrows on an Apple Macintosh computer, was released as Yung & Moore Versus The Whole Goddam Stinkin World. (The sleeve depicts the duo as cartoon superheroes about to demolish the planet – an intended visual metaphor for the antipathy the mainstream has shown both artists' music over the years.)

2006 saw Burrows returning to the musical abstraction of his earlier career with Tonesucker, a prolific "fundamentalist" noise/drone project that has performed widely at festivals across Europe. Burrows has also performed on theremin and VCS3 at Britain's prestigious Aldeburgh Festival.

2022 saw a new flurry of activity with the release of double albums by Family Yung - a project with his teenage son, Louis - and The Chrysanthemums.

Selected discography
Jung Analysts:
A Leading Surgeon Speaks (LP, 1984)
The Wishing Balloons (LP, 1984/Cassette 2017)
Sprockendidootch (LP, 1985/Cassette 2017)
A Leading Surgeon Speaks + (Cassette, 2017)
Push-Button Pleasure:
The Vast Difference (LP 1986/Cassette 2018)
The Last Dissonance (LP 1988/Cassette 2018)
The Chrysanthemums:
Mouth Pain/Another Sacred Day (7" 1987)
Is That A Fish On Your Shoulder or are you just pleased to see me? (LP/CD 1987)
The **** Sessions (12" 1988)
Little Flecks Of Foam Around Barking (CD/2x LP 1988)
Picasso's Problem/Live at London Palladium (12" 1990)
Porcupine Quills (LP/CD 1991)
Odessey and Oracle (LP/CD 1992)
Chrysanthemums Go Germany/Insekt Insekt (LP/CD/Box 1995)
Chrys&themums:
The Baby's Head (CD 1998)
A Thousand Tiny Pieces (CD EP 1998)
As Yukio Yung:
Tree Climbing Goats (and other analysing shanties) (LP 1987)
Valborgmassoafton (Cassette 1991)
Art Pop Stupidity 1993 (LP)
A Brainless Deconstruction Of The Popular Song (CD 1993)
Keep The Black Flag Flying/Yukio's Dream #6 (Reservoir Girls) (7" 1994)
(Mostly) Water (CD EP 1996)
Good-bye Pork Pie Brain (10" LP 1996)
Hello Pulsing Vein (10" LP 1997)
Good-bye Pork Pie Brain/Hello Pulsing Vein (2x10: LP Box 1997)
Yung & Moore/The Yung & Moore Show
Objectivity  (CD EP 1997)
Conscientious Objector (RSM CD 2004)
The Yung & Moore Show (CD 2006)
Asmus Tietchens & Terry Burrows
Watching the Burning Bride (LP 1986)
Burning the Watching Bride (LP 1998)
Watching the Burning Bride/Burning The Watching Bride (CD 2017)
Terry Burrows:
The Whispering Scale (LP 1989)
Live at Splitting the Atom (CD 2016)
YooKO:
Matrix/Swirl (12" 1992)
Everybody Get it Together (12" 1992)
Tonesucker:
Slaughterhouse (CD 2006)
Live In Canada (CD 2008)
Caput Mortuum (DVD 2010)
Live In London (DVD 2010)
Sator Arepo Tenet Opera Rotas (CD 2011)
Omnia Convivia Crastina (CD 2012)
Sub Rosa (CD 2013)
Initium (CD 2017)
Memento Mori (Cassette/USB Stick/CD 2018)

References

External links
The Official Terry Burrows website
Terry Burrows' MySpace website
Yukio Yung's Cabinet of Curiosities
Onoma Research (UK label)
Tonesucker website

Living people
People educated at Northgate Grammar School, Ipswich
Alumni of the University of East Anglia
English multi-instrumentalists
musicians from Ipswich
Year of birth missing (living people)